Quietman is a trance music group.

The group was created by Larry Lush and Wilf Frost.

The launch of their first single, Plastic Gourd, gave them the platform on which they built a solid reputation. This was followed by another Top 50 hit Now And Zen in 1997. Their reputation was confirmed in 1998, when they worked with Man With No Name on The Sleeper.

Their debut 1998 album Shhhh was one of the best selling albums on Platipus Records.

More recently, Quietman have been remixing and performing on live shows.

External links
 Quietman - Platipus Records
 

Musical groups established in 1994
Trance music groups